Roman Stanislavovich Tseryuta (born 1 November 1982) is a Russian professional football manager and a former player.

Club career
He made his debut in the Russian Premier League in 2002 for FC Saturn-RenTV Ramenskoye.

References

1982 births
People from Pyatigorsk
Living people
Russian footballers
Association football defenders
FC Olimpia Volgograd players
FC Saturn Ramenskoye players
FC Baltika Kaliningrad players
Russian Premier League players
FC Irtysh Omsk players
Russian football managers
FC Kuban Krasnodar players
FC Dynamo Saint Petersburg players
Sportspeople from Stavropol Krai
FC Mashuk-KMV Pyatigorsk players
FC Dynamo Makhachkala players
FC Amur Blagoveshchensk players